Brownstown is an unincorporated community and census-designated place (CDP) in West Earl Township, Lancaster County, Pennsylvania, United States. As of the 2010 census the population was 2,816.

Geography
Brownstown is in central Lancaster County, in the west part of West Earl Township.

The main route through Brownstown is Pennsylvania Route 772 (South State Street), which leads northwest  to Lititz and southeast  to Leola. U.S. Route 222, a four-lane expressway, runs just to the west of the center of town, with access via an interchange with PA 772. US 222 leads northeast  to Reading and southwest to Lancaster. Route 272 runs parallel to and northwest of Route 222. The intersection of routes 772 and 272 is currently one of the most heavily traveled areas In Lancaster County.

The Conestoga River forms the southern boundary of the community, and Cocalico Creek forms the western boundary (and of West Earl Township), joining the Conestoga southwest of the center of town. It is part of the Susquehanna River watershed.

Demographics

References

Populated places in Lancaster County, Pennsylvania
Census-designated places in Lancaster County, Pennsylvania